Tomatin railway station served the village of Tomatin, Highland, Scotland from 1897 to 1965 on the Inverness and Aviemore Direct Railway.

History 
The station opened on 8 July 1897 by the Highland Railway. The station closed to both passengers and goods traffic on 3 May 1965.

References

External links 

Disused railway stations in Highland (council area)
Railway stations in Great Britain opened in 1897
Railway stations in Great Britain closed in 1965
1897 establishments in Scotland
1965 disestablishments in Scotland
Beeching closures in Scotland
Former Highland Railway stations